The Gruppo Sportivo Fiamme Azzurre is the sport section of the Italian police force Polizia Penitenziaria.

History

The first participation at the Summer Olympic Games was in Seoul 1988 while the one at the Winter Olympic Games was Turin 2006.

Sports
Are 19 the disciplines that athletes of the G.S. Fiamme Azzurre are involved.

2016 Olympic Games
There were 19 athletes from the Fiamme Azzurre who participated in the Rio 2016 Olympic Games. The only medal was won by Captain of the Fiamme azzurre team, the shooter Giovanni Pellielo, already in his fourth Olympic medal.
Archery: Claudia Mandia
Athletics: Eleonora Giorgi, Anna Incerti
Boxing: Vincenzo Mangiacapre, Clemente Russo
Cyclism: Elena Cecchini, Tatiana Guderzo, Simona Frapporti
Fencing: Aldo Montano
Modern pentathlon: Claudia Cesarini
Sailing: Vittorio Bissaro, Silvia Sicouri, Mattia Camboni
Shooting: Giovanni Pellielo
Swimming: Michele Santucci, Ilaria Bianchi
Triathlon: Davide Uccellari, Charlotte Bonin
Weightlifting: Giorgia Bordignon

Best results
The first Olympic podium was achieved in Barcelona 1992.

Other notable athletes

Athletics: Paolo Camossi, Giuseppe D'Urso, Rossella Giordano, Andrea Benvenuti, Nicola Vizzoni
 Cycling: Marta Bastianelli
Figure skating: Carolina Kostner
Skeleton: Mattia Gaspari and Valentina Margaglio (bronze medal in mixed at the IBSF World Championships 2020)

See also
Polizia Penitenziaria
Italian military sports bodies
European Champion Clubs Cup (athletics)

References

External links
 
G.S. Fiamme Azzurre at Olympedia.org

 
Organizations established in 1983
Sports organizations established in 1983
Athletics clubs in Italy